Bhoomi Malayalam is a 2009 Malayalam film directed by T. V. Chandran. The film features Suresh Gopi in a dual role along with Nedumudi Venu, Samvrutha Sunil, Padmapriya and other actors. The film won the Kerala State Film Award for Second Best Film in 2008. It also won the John Abraham Award for Best Malayalam Film in 2008.

Bhoomi Malayalam depicts the plight of seven different women, each of whom represent different periods of time. Starting from the early 1980s, the film moves down to the present era.

Plot 
The movie recounts an incident that took place in Thillenkeri in Kannur district in 1948 April 15. The Communist party was struggling against the rule of Jawaharlal Nehru at that period. In Thillenkeri, comrade  Ananthan Master was the leader of the Communist party.

He was shot dead  while he was leading a demonstration against feudals. His wife Meenakshi was pregnant at that time and later gave birth to a baby girl Janaki Amma. Janaki Amma's son is Narayanan Kutty. From the first generation Ananthan to third generation Narayanan Kutty, the film attempts to capture the fear that has been pervading the life of women living in different periods of time, at different places.

Cast 
 Suresh Gopi as Ananthan, Narayanan Kutty
 Nedumudi Venu
 Arun as Rahul
 Samvrutha Sunil as Nirmala
 Padmapriya as Fousia
 Priyanka Nair as Annie
 Lakshmi Sharma
 Manikandan Pattambi
 Kripa as Sathi
 Nanda
 Jasna
 Lakshmipriya

See also
 Malayalam films of 2009

References

External links
 
 Boomi Malayalam at Oneindia.in

2009 films
2009 drama films
Indian drama films
2000s Malayalam-language films
Films directed by T. V. Chandran
Films shot in Kannur
Films set in Kerala